The canton of Moyen Adour is an administrative division of the Hautes-Pyrénées department, southwestern France. It was created at the French canton reorganisation which came into effect in March 2015. Its seat is in Barbazan-Debat.

It consists of the following communes:
 
Allier
Angos
Arcizac-Adour
Barbazan-Debat
Bernac-Debat
Bernac-Dessus
Horgues
Laloubère
Momères
Montignac
Odos
Salles-Adour
Saint-Martin
Sarrouilles
Vielle-Adour

References

Cantons of Hautes-Pyrénées